Mürşüdoba (also, Murshudoba and Myurshyudoba) is a village and municipality in Khachmaz Rayon, Azerbaijan.  It has a population of 1,672.  The municipality consists of the villages of Mürşüdoba and Sabiroba.

References 

Populated places in Khachmaz District